Laurie Lever (born 12 October 1947 in Manchester, England) is an Olympic-level equestrian rider, who competes for Australia. He was selected for the 2008 Summer Olympics at the age of 60, making him the oldest member of Australia's 2008 team and one of the oldest people to make an Olympic debut. He will compete in jumping at Beijing aboard Ashleigh Drossel Dan.  He finished in 23rd position in the individual event, and 7th in the teams event.

References

Living people
Olympic equestrians of Australia
Australian male equestrians
1947 births
Equestrians at the 2008 Summer Olympics